The Buranga Geothermal Power Station, is a proposed  geothermal power station in Uganda.

Location
The coordinates of Buranga Hot Springs are 0°49'59.0"N, 30°10'01.0"E (Latitude:0.833062; Longitude:30.166947).

Overview
As part of efforts to diversify the national electricity sources, the government of Uganda licensed Green Impact Development Services (GIDS) to drill an exploratory well in the Buranga Hot Springs area. GIDS plans to drill three deep wells and to generate at least 30 megawatts from each well. However some sources have indicated that these plans may be too ambitious for a  greenfield site with no prior history of geothermal output.

Funding
The cost of construction is budgeted at US$42 million.

Recent developments
Following an explosion at a drilling site located at Kibiro in Hoima District on the night of 29 March 2020, the Uganda Ministry of Energy and Mineral Development halted drilling at that site, at another site in Panyimur, Pakwach District and at the Buranga site in Bundibugyo District. Drilling may resume after a detailed "environmental and social impact assessment" (ESIA) is conducted.

See also

List of power stations in Uganda 
Energy in Uganda

References

External links
 The Rise of East Africa As An Alternative Energy Mecca

Geothermal power stations in Uganda
Proposed geothermal power stations
Proposed renewable energy power stations in Uganda
Bundibugyo District